Maxime Biset (born 26 March 1986) is a Belgian football coach and a former midfielder. He works as an assistant coach with Antwerp.

Coaching career
Following his retirement from playing at the end of the 2021–22 season, on 16 June 2021 he was hired as an assistant coach by Antwerp.

References

External links
 

1986 births
Sportspeople from Charleroi
Footballers from Hainaut (province)
Living people
Belgian footballers
Association football midfielders
K.V. Mechelen players
Royal Antwerp F.C. players
K.V.C. Westerlo players
Belgian Pro League players
Challenger Pro League players
Belgian football managers